The Odisha Open is an annual badminton tournament held in India. The tournament is a part of the BWF World Tour tournaments and is leveled in BWF Tour Super 100. The inaugural edition was held in 2022 at the Jawaharlal Nehru Indoor Stadium in Cuttack, Odisha.

Winners

Performances by nation

See also
India Open
Syed Modi International Badminton Championships
Hyderabad Open
India International Challenge

References 

Odisha Open
Badminton tournaments in India
Sports competitions in Odisha
2022 establishments in Odisha
Recurring sporting events established in 2022